Ivan Viktorovich Semenets (born 1 October 1981) is a former Russian professional footballer.

Club career
He made his debut in the Russian Premier League in 2001 for FC Fakel Voronezh.

External links
 

1981 births
Living people
Russian footballers
Association football defenders
FC Fakel Voronezh players
Russian Premier League players